Tony Grantham (born 30 December 1972) is a New Zealand international lawn and indoor bowler.

Bowls career
Grantham from Whanganui, in New Zealand won the New Zealand national championship which qualified him to play in the 2007 World Singles Champion of Champions event. He won the gold medal in the event beating Will James of Swaziland in the final.

He won two medals at the 2011 Asia Pacific Bowls Championships in Adelaide. One year later he then won a bronze medal in the triples at the 2012 World Outdoor Bowls Championship in Adelaide.

Grantham also competed for New Zealand at the 2014 Commonwealth Games and has won three National titles; the 2007 singles title, 2013/14 pairs and 2013/14 fours title at the New Zealand National Bowls Championships, when bowling for the Birkenhead Bowls Club.

In 2022, he competed in the men's pairs and the men's fours at the 2022 Commonwealth Games.

Personal life
His partner is fellow bowls international Leanne Chinery of Canada.

References

External links
 
 

1972 births
Living people
New Zealand male bowls players
Commonwealth Games competitors for New Zealand
Bowls players at the 2014 Commonwealth Games
Bowls players at the 2022 Commonwealth Games
20th-century New Zealand people
21st-century New Zealand people